Emerald railway station may refer to:

Emerald railway station, Queensland, Australia
Emerald railway station, Melbourne, Australia